Land of Wine is a 16-episode South Korean television drama broadcast by SBS in 2003.

Synopsis
In a place far from the town lived a boy and a girl. The girl's name was Li Shan Xi. Her grandfather and father were selling traditional wine to earn money. They produce their own wine in a small shop. The boy's name was Xu Jun (Kim Jae Won). His parents, and Shan Xi's father and grandfather lived together.

From childhood, Shan Xi and Xu Jun were friends. After a few years, as they grew up, Xu Jun became a naughty boy. He always complained that he had no money to buy the things he wanted. He ran away from home to the town to find work. He promised Shan Xi that after he becomes rich he will want to live happily with Shan Xi. When he reached the town he worked as a waiter in a bar which belonged to the company of Shi Wang. The son of the owner was Dao Yi and his younger sister Ai Ling.

Cast
Kim Jaewon as Suh Joon
Kim Min-jung as Sun Hee
Lee Se-young as child Sun Hee
Choi Kang-hee as Song Ae-ryeong
Lee Dong-wook as Song Do-il
Park In-hwan as Lee Jin-pyeong
Lee Jung-gil as Song Hoe-jang
Park Byung-hoon as Lee Jong-eon
Kil Yong-woo as Suh Tae-gwan
Kyung In-sun as Oh Hae-ran
Kim Ha-yun as Suh Yeon
Jo Hyung-ki as Jae Bok
Kim Kyu-chul as Kil Soo
Maeng Bong-hak

Awards and nominations

References

External links
 , official site
 , JS Pictures
Drama "Land of Wine", SBS Global
Drama "Land of Wine" (2003), SBS Productions

Seoul Broadcasting System television dramas
2003 South Korean television series debuts
2003 South Korean television series endings
South Korean cooking television series
South Korean romance television series
Television series by JS Pictures